Yaritani (yarita local name for Azorella compacta, Aymara -ni a suffix to indicate ownership, "the one with yarita", Hispanicized spelling Yaretani) is a  mountain in the Andes of Bolivia. It lies in the Oruro Department, Sajama Province, in the north of the Turco Municipality. Yaritani is situated southwest of the mountain Wankarani and north of Qhapaqa.

References 

Mountains of Oruro Department